The 2013 PartyPoker.net European Championship was the sixth edition of the Professional Darts Corporation tournament, the European Championship, which allows the top European players to compete against the highest ranked players from the PDC Order of Merit. The tournament took place from 4–7 July at the RWE-Sporthalle in Mülheim, Germany.

The defending champion, Simon Whitlock, pulled off an incredible comeback in his quarter-final match against Jamie Caven to win 10–9 having been 3–9 down. He advanced to the final once more where he faced Adrian Lewis. Lewis won his third major title by defeating the Australian 11–6.

Prize money
The 2013 European Championship has a total prize fund of £200,000. The following is the breakdown of the fund:

Qualification
The top 16 players from the PDC Order of Merit on 23 June automatically qualified for the event. The top eight from them were also the seeded players. The remaining 16 places went to the top eight non-qualified players from the PDC Pro Tour Order of Merit, with further places awarded to the top seven non-qualified players from the Continental Europe Order of Merit and the leader of the Scandinavian Order of Merit after four of eight events. Gary Anderson withdrew before the event began due to illness so Mark Webster took his place due to being the next non-qualified player from the PDC Order of Merit.

These are the participants:

Draw
The draw was held on 23 June 2013.

Broadcasting
On 14 June 2013, the PDC announced that the European Championship would be broadcast in the United Kingdom on ITV4 for the next three years. It was also shown on RTL 7 in the Netherlands, Sport1 in Germany, Fox Sports in Australia and on Sky New Zealand.

References

External links
 Official site

European Championship (darts)
European Championship
European Championship